Torodora ponomarenkoae is a moth in the family Lecithoceridae. It was described by H.S. Rose and Prakesh C. Pathania in 2003. It is found in Himachal Pradesh, India.

References

Moths described in 2003
Torodora